The Central American crisis began in the late 1970s, when major civil wars and communist revolutions erupted in various countries in Central America, causing it to become the world's most volatile region in terms of socioeconomic change. In particular, the United States feared that victories by communist forces would cause South America to become isolated from the United States if the governments of the Central American countries were overthrown and pro-Soviet communist governments were installed in their place. During these civil wars, the United States pursued its interests by supporting right-wing governments, who were supported by the elite classes, against left-wing guerrillas, who were supported by the peasant and working class.

In the aftermath of the Second World War and continuing into the 1960s and 1970s, Latin America's economic landscape drastically changed. The United Kingdom and the United States both held political and economic interests in Latin America, whose economy developed based on external dependence. Rather than solely relying on agricultural exportation, this new system promoted internal development and relied on regional common markets, banking capital, interest rates, taxes, and growing capital at the expense of labor and the peasant class. The Central American Crisis was, in part, a reaction by the most marginalized members of Latin American society to unjust land tenure, labor coercion, and unequal political representation. Landed property had taken hold of the economic and political landscape of the region, giving large corporations much influence over the region and thrusting formerly self-sufficient farmers and lower-class workers into hardship.

Countries

Nicaragua

 
The Sandinista National Liberation Front (FSLN) overthrew the 46-year-long Somoza dictatorship in 1979. However, the United States opposed the Nicaraguan revolution due to FSLN's communists sympathies and support from Castro's Cuba, and backed an anti-left wing Counter-revolutionary rebellion against the Sandinista government.

El Salvador

 Fought between the military-led government of El Salvador and the Farabundo Martí National Liberation Front (FMLN), a coalition or umbrella organization of five left-wing militias.  Over the course of the 1970s, significant tensions and violence had already existed, before the civil war's full outbreak.

The United States supported the Salvadoran military government and supplied them with four billion dollars, trained their military elites, and provided them with arms over the course of a decade. Israel also actively supported the government forces and was El Salvador's largest supplier of arms from 1970 to 1976. The conflict ended in the early 1990s. Between 75,000 and 90,000 people were killed during the war.

Guatemala

Following a CIA-backed coup ousting Jacobo Árbenz in 1954, civil war ensued in Guatemala between 1962 and 1996. In Guatemala, the Rebel Armed Forces (FAR) fighting against the government were based exclusively in rural areas, and were made up of a large peasant and indigenous population. They ran a multifaceted operation and led an armed mass struggle of national character. Guatemala saw an increase in violence in the late 1970s, marked by the 1978 Panzós massacre. In 1982 the resurgent guerrilla groups united in the Guatemalan National Revolutionary Unity.

The presidency of Efraín Ríos Montt (1982–1983), during which he implemented a strategy he called "beans and bullets", is widely considered the war's turning point. The Guatemalan government and the severely weakened guerrillas signed a peace agreement in December 1996, ending the war. Over 200,000 people died over the course of the civil war, disproportionately indigenous people targeted by the Ríos Montt headed military. On 10 May 2013, Ríos Montt was convicted of genocide and sentenced to 80 years in prison.

Honduras

Going in to the Central American crisis, Honduras had suffered constant coups and military dictatorships. Consequently, by the 1980s the country slowly started a deteriorating process in terms of trade, continuing problems with the Central American common market, the decline of international financial reserves, salary decline, and increasing unemployment and underemployment. Honduras, like El Salvador, was increasingly dependent on economic assistance from the United States. However, the efforts to start a revolution failed, since apart from the actions of the paramilitary group of the Popular Liberation Movement-Cinchonero and other organizations there were no major attempts. This was due to the military reformism of the military junta governments of the 1960s and 1970s led by Oswaldo López Arellano and Juan Alberto Melgar.

Nevertheless, fears that the civil wars wracking its neighbors might spread to the country led to the murder, torture, and disappearances of any individual identified as a dissident, spearheaded by the Honduran army's death squad Battalion 3-16, who received training and support from Central Intelligence Agency of the United States. Honduras became a key base for the Reagan administration's response to the crisis, making the Honduran territory a huge US army base to maintain military control in Central America.

US troops held large military exercises in Honduras during the 1980s, and trained thousands of Salvadorans in the country. The nation also hosted bases for the Nicaraguan Contras. In 1986, they began to see armed conflicts on the border with Nicaragua, which ended in the aerial bombardment of two Nicaraguan towns by the Honduran Air Force. By 1998, the Mitch hurricane left more than 2 million Hondurans without a home or job, a good portion of the infrastructure that was totally damaged, dragging Honduras into more poverty.

United States response
Operation Condor
Caribbean Basin Initiative
 Central American migrant caravans
Reagan Doctrine
Foreign interventions by the United States
United States involvement in regime change in Latin America
Latin America–United States relations
Zapatista Crisis

Legacy
By the late 1980s, El Salvador, Guatemala, and Honduras all implemented reforms pushing their economies into the neoliberal model, such as privatizing state companies, liberalizing trade, weakening labor laws, and increasing consumption taxes in attempts to stabilize their economies. , violence still reigns over Central America. A common legacy of the Central American crisis was the displacement and destruction of indigenous communities, especially in Guatemala where they were considered potential supporters of both the government and guerrilla forces.

Peace efforts 
Several Latin American nations formed the Contadora Group to work for a resolution to the region's wars. Later, Costa Rican President Óscar Arias succeeded in convincing the other Central American leaders to sign the Esquipulas Peace Agreement, which eventually provided the framework for ending the civil wars.

See also

 Operation Condor
 CIA activities in Nicaragua
 CIA activities in Honduras
 Proxy war
 Oliver North

References

Bibliography

External links
Central American Crisis from the Dean Peter Krogh Foreign Affairs Digital Archives

Cold War conflicts
Cold War in Latin America
Dirty wars
El Salvador–United States relations
Guatemala–United States relations
History of Central America
Revolutionary waves
United States–Central American relations
State-sponsored terrorism
Proxy wars
CIA activities in the Americas
1970s in North America
1980s in North America
1990s in North America
History of Honduras